Alejandro Vences Villegas (born August 20, 1990, in Toluca, State of Mexico) is a former professional Mexican footballer who last played for Potros UAEM

References

External links
 

1990 births
Living people
Association football goalkeepers
Unión de Curtidores footballers
Club Necaxa footballers
Tampico Madero F.C. footballers
Alebrijes de Oaxaca players
Potros UAEM footballers
Ascenso MX players
Liga Premier de México players
Tercera División de México players
People from Toluca
Footballers from the State of Mexico
Mexican footballers